Prince Janusz Wiśniowiecki (1598–1636) was Polish nobleman, koniuszy wielki koronny (i.e. High Royal Equerry) from 1633, starost of Krzemieniec.

In 1631 after the death of Jerzy Zbaraski inherited Puławy.

Marriage and issue
Janusz married Katarzyna Eugenia Tyszkiewicz on 19 September 1627 in Wilno, the daughter of voivode of Mścisław, Troki and Wilno Janusz Skumin Tyszkiewicz h. Leliwa and had four children: 
 Dymitr Jerzy Wiśniowiecki (1631–1682), married Marianna Zamoyska h. Jelita, later Princess Teofila Ludwika Zasławska
 Konstanty Krzysztof Wiśniowiecki (1633–1686), married Urszula Teresa Mniszech, daughter of castellan of Nowy Sącz Franciszek Bernard Mniszech, later Anna Chodorowska h. Korczak
 Anna Wiśniowiecka
 Barbara Katarzyna Wiśniowiecka

Legacy
Samuel Twardowski, a 17th-century Polish poet and writer, wrote an epic Książę Wiśniowiecki Janusz (or Prince Janusz Wiśniowiecki).

Bibliography
 Ilona Czamańska: Wiśniowieccy. Monografia rodu. Poznań: Wydawnictwo Poznańskie, 2007, .

References

1598 births
1636 deaths
Janusz Wisniowiecki